Stâlpeni is a commune in Argeș County, Muntenia, Romania. It is composed of seven villages: Dealu Frumos, Livezeni, Ogrezea, Oprești, Pițigaia, Rădești and Stâlpeni.

References

Communes in Argeș County
Localities in Muntenia